Adolf Abicht (1793–1860) was a Polish-Lithuanian physician. He was a professor of general pathology, therapy, and medical history at the Vilnius University, and was a president of the Medical Society in Vilnius from 1829–1838.

References

1793 births
1860 deaths
Polish pathologists
Lithuanian physicians
Academic staff of Vilnius University